Phaya Sai Songkhram was a ruler of the historical Thai Kingdom of Sukhothai.

Ancestry

Kings of Sukhothai
Thai princes
Year of birth missing
Year of death missing